In quantum mechanics, back action refers to the effect of a detector on a measurement. Ideally, a detector should have no influence on the quantity it is measuring.  However, in quantum systems it is sometimes the case that back action by the detector is an inherent feature of the system, and not just a result of the detector being imperfect. Back action has important consequences for the measurement process, and is a significant factor in measurements near quantum limits, such as measurements approaching the Standard Quantum Limit (SQL).

Back action is an area of active research. Recent experiments with nanomechanical systems have attempted to evade back action while making measurements.

References 

Quantum mechanics